The 1895 Wisconsin Badgers football team represented the University of Wisconsin as an independent during the 1895 college football season. Led by Hiram O. Stickney in his second and final season as head coach, the Badgers compiled a record of 5–2–1. The team's captain was John R. Richards.

Schedule

Roster

Roster from 1895 Badger Yearbook

References

Wisconsin
Wisconsin Badgers football seasons
Wisconsin Badgers football